National Beer Day may refer to:
 National Beer Day (United Kingdom), a holiday on June 15
 National Beer Day (United States), a holiday on April 7

See also 
 Beer day
 Beer Day (Iceland), a holiday on March 1
 International Beer Day